The 2006–07 season was Kilmarnock's eighth consecutive season in the Scottish Premier League, having competed in it since its inauguration in 1998–99. Kilmarnock also competed in the Scottish Cup,  and reached the League Cup final.

Summary

Season
Kilmarnock finished fifth in the Scottish Premier League with 55 points, the same standing and points tally as the previous season. They reached the final of the Scottish League Cup, but were beaten by Hibernian. Kilmarnock also reached the third round of the Scottish Cup, losing to Greenock Morton.

Results and fixtures

Pre-season

Scottish Premier League

Scottish League Cup

Scottish Cup

Player statistics

|}

Final league table

Division summary

Transfers

Players in

Players out

References

External links
 Kilmarnock 2006–07 at Soccerbase.com (select relevant season from dropdown list)

Kilmarnock F.C. seasons
Kilmarnock